Henry & Me is a 2014 American animated drama film directed by Barrett Esposito and written by David I. Stern. The film stars Richard Gere, Chazz Palminteri, Danny Aiello, Cyndi Lauper, Paul Simon, Austin Williams, Lucie Arnaz and Hank Steinbrenner. The film was released on DVD on September 30, 2014.

Plot
Jack McCarthy (Austin Williams) is an 11-going-on-12-year-old boy living a privileged life in upstate New York. He and his parents (Joseph Gian and Lucie Arnaz) are major fans of the New York Yankees and have attended many of their games. As he and his father are called to dinner, Jack goes through a temporary state of anemia and drops the ball. His parents are convinced that something is terribly wrong with their son, much to their horror.

The scene switches to Jack in the hospital, where he has contracted cancer to the point where he is completely bald. As he is carted away for an operation, his parents stay behind, and his chaperone Nurse Cyndi (Cyndi Lauper) sings a jaunty tune of "Take Me Out to The Ball Game" to no avail of lifting the boy's spirits. She leaves Jack outside the room, but not before she treats Jack with a sedative to give him "sweet dreams". Unhappy with the hardships brought upon by his newly contracted illness, Jack contemplates the (seemingly) final moments of his life until he is greeted by a guardian angel taking the form of a Yankees executive named Henry (Richard Gere). At first, Jack is hesitant to watch the game while he waits, but unwittingly accepts Henry's offer and the man takes him into an imaginary plane of existence where the 20th century is timeless, illness has no existence, the Yankee players of the past are alive and well and most of all, his hair is back.

Henry and Jack's first stop is early 1930, where they meet Babe Ruth (Chazz Palminteri) in a small field surrounded by corn. He convinces Jack to take the bat, and after a nervous fib about a peanut allergy, strikes out three times. Babe convinces him to try again, yet this time, his teammates laugh Jack off for his age. After successfully stealing home run, Jack bids goodbye and rides off in Henry's 1935 Cord 810 convertible for a fun-filled drive into the skies.

Jack and Henry's next stop is mid-1960, where, to Jack's surprise, the original Yankee Stadium is still standing next to the new one. Then in the Yankees' locker room, he meets Lefty Gomez (Luis Guzman), Mickey Mantle, Bobby Murcer and Thurman Munson. Again, Jack is forced into a position on the team, this time to throw the ball from the pitcher's mound. When an actual game ensues, Munson encourages Jack to pitch the ball to Mantle, but he refuses (by saying that he is not a real pitcher). Despite Jack's inexperience, Munson and Jack continue with an upbeat exchange of words until Jack's blood pressure starts to drop, realizing that the game he is fighting for is his life in the physical world. A short montage set to a ballad version of "Time After Time" shows Jack in what appears to be Heaven, watching several moments of his life up to the hospital with other kids, and making him concerned for his parents. When he asks Cissy, a girl he met on Henry's subway train, if she misses her mother and father, she replies "every day", implying that she too is dead and is living in the imaginary world as a spirit. Cissy and some other baseball kids bid Jack goodbye, but not before she shouts back "We're all rooting for you!" With that, Jack wins the battle, and the game.

Automatically transported to the present, Jack meets the elderly George Steinbrenner, who offers him a place on the team. With the permission of the other team members, among them Yogi Berra, Reggie Jackson and "Goose" Gossage, encourage him to be a winner. Magically outfitted with a real Yankee uniform fit for his size, Jack soon finds himself playing alongside Curtis Granderson and Hideki Matsui in a large scale game against the nondescript Boston Red Sox. After the Sox pitcher tips the pitch, causing Matsui to hit the ball into the team bench, Jack quickly whispers Babe Ruth's words into Matsui and later on, he bats the ball so hard it goes straight into Monument Park.

Nighttime falls and Jack asks Henry if he can meet Joe DiMaggio, Roger Maris and Billy Martin, but Henry suggests saving it for another time and decides to have Jack return home. With an impending rainstorm reflecting the borderline of his decision, Jack is unwilling to return to his unhealthy life and considers staying where he can give his body all the health and exercise he deserves. After running off, leaving his cap behind, Jack is found by Henry in his chair and reveals that he is Lou Gehrig, another player stricken by disease. Taking his advice that he should keep playing for his life, Jack finally gives in and waves goodbye to Henry, Lefty and Babe Ruth, who arrive just in time to see the boy leave into the real world.

Now back in the hospital, Jack wakes up to the joy of his parents and to his surprise is visited by the team. Although Jack is confident that his hair will grow back, Mr. Steinbrenner gives him the right of being called a New York Yankee with a pin, the same kind worn by Henry.

In a post-credits scene, Henry and Ruth pick up Mr. Steinbrenner in his Cord.

Cast

 Austin Williams as Jack 
 Richard Gere as Henry "Lou" Gehrig 
 Chazz Palminteri as George "The Babe" Ruth
 Danny Aiello as Dr. Acosta 
 Cyndi Lauper as Nurse Cyndi 
 Paul Simon as Thurman Munson 
 Lucie Arnaz as Jack's Mom 
 Joseph Gian as Jack's Dad
 Hank Steinbrenner as George Steinbrenner
 Luis Guzmán as Vernon "Lefty" Gomez
 Reggie Jackson as himself 
 Nick Swisher as himself
 Yogi Berra as himself 
 Hideki Matsui as himself 
 Michael Kay as himself 
 Joe Girardi as himself 
 Mariano Rivera as himself
 Bernie Williams as himself 
 Jorge Posada as himself 
 David Mantle as Mickey Mantle
 Mark Teixeira as himself
 John Sterling as himself 
 Bob Sheppard as Stadium Announcer
 CC Sabathia as himself
 Linda Tosetti as Nurse 
 Serena Girardi as Little Girl On Train 
 Scott Clark as Bobby Murcer
 Curtis Granderson as himself 
 Goose Gossage as himself 
 Nancy Newman as Nurse
 Mickey Rivers as himself 
 Emily Lashendock as Baseball Fan
 Kevin Long as himself

Release
The film premiered at the Ziegfeld Theatre in New York City on August 18, 2014. The film was released on DVD on September 30, 2014.

Production
The film began production in 2009. In January 2010, Yankee Stadium announcer Bob Sheppard recorded his dialogue for the film, six months before his death in July 2010. In February 2010, Hank Steinbrenner recorded his dialogue in the role of his father George Steinbrenner. In September 2014, Hank Steinbrenner told The Hollywood Reporter: "When my dad got sick, my dad actually asked me to do the voice, and that was really the whole start of it. I know that people look at my father as an iconic figure, but I was looking at him more as my father. It was something that I knew I could do, and I was actually really excited to do it. I knew that no one else could bring out the gist of my dad and no one knew him like me. And I always considered myself a pretty good actor in my own right." In August 2010, CC Sabathia and Yogi Berra recorded their dialogue for the film.

In 2013, after the Biogenesis baseball scandal, Alex Rodriguez' scenes were cut from the film. The film's producer Joseph Avallone explained: "Its message of hope in the face of insurmountable odds—as told through the fantastical story of a young boy who goes on a magical journey with the New York Yankees—features, among A-list Hollywood talent, a collection of real-life Yankees, past and present, lending their voices and their spirits to this heartwarming tale. In 2009, Alex Rodriguez accepted an offer to participate in the film, in part, as a way to rehabilitate his image after his first bout with controversy surrounding performance enhancing drugs. When it became clear in summer 2013 that Rodriguez’s commitment to that rehabilitation was not entirely genuine, the film’s producers made the costly and time-consuming, but absolutely essential, decision to remove his voice performance from the final cut in an effort to preserve all of the goodwill that went into making this film—including the work of our charity partners. Henry & Me is family entertainment first and foremost, and we look forward to children, their parents, and sports fans across the country and around the world discovering the film when it premieres on DVD and digital download this fall." He was replaced with Hideki Matsui.

Reception
On review aggregator Rotten Tomatoes, the film holds an approval rating of 80% based on 5 reviews, with an average rating of 6/10.

References

External links
 
 

2014 films
2014 3D films
2014 animated films
2010s American animated films
2010s sports films
Baseball animation
American baseball films
2010s English-language films